Anis Basim Moujahid (born 4 July 1992), better known as Basim, is a Danish pop singer and songwriter. He is of Moroccan origin. He has released two albums, Alt det jeg ville have sagt in 2008 and Befri dig selv in 2009. Basim represented Denmark in the Eurovision Song Contest 2014 on home ground in Copenhagen, Denmark with the song "Cliche Love Song". The following year he was the Danish spokesperson at Eurovision.

Career

2008: The X Factor and Alt det jeg ville have sagt

At age of 15, he took part in the 2008 edition of the talent program The X Factor and reached the quarterfinals before being voted out. After X Factor, Basim released his debut album in 2008 entitled Alt det jeg ville have sagt (meaning "Everything I would have said"). For the album, he collaborated with Danish X Factor judge Remee and engaged on a tour in the country. The album reached No. 8 in the Danish Albums Chart going gold. There were three singles from the album, "Alt det jeg ville have sagt", "Jeg vil" and "Baby, jeg savner dig".

Performances during X Factor

2009: Befri dig selv

In October 2009, he released his second album Befri dig selv (in Danish "Free yourself"). The album reached No. 21 on the Danish Albums Chart and saw release of two singles "Lad ikke solen gå ned" (reaching No. 15 in the Danish Singles Chart) and title track "Befri dig selv". Basim has also participated in the 2009 edition of Vild med dans, the Danish edition of Dancing with the Stars, where he danced with Claudia Rex, finishing 9th.

2014–present: Eurovision Song Contest

On 8 March 2014, Basim won the Danish "Melodi Grand Prix" (the Danish qualification for Eurovision) with "Cliche Love Song". Basim represented Denmark in the Eurovision Song Contest 2014. EBU announced on 17 March Basim would perform 23rd in the running order of the final. He placed 9th in the final, scoring 74 points. The following year Basim was the Danish spokesperson at the Eurovision Song Contest 2015 in Vienna.

Personal life
Basim is the son of Abdel Moujahid and his wife Zohra. His father, Abdel, suffered from cancer. Basim's rendition on the album Alt det jeg ville have sagt entitled Himlen Har Alt For Mange Engle ("Heaven Has Too Many angels") was dedicated to his father who died in 2012.

Basim's older brother Nabil Moujahid took part in the 2010 edition (third season) of the Danish X Factor as part of the group formation In-Joy. The four-member formation also including Essi, Jannick and Kevin was one of the nine finalists during the show. However In-Joy was eliminated at the end of the second week of the live shows of the competition finishing eighth overall.

Influences
Basim is mostly compared to Bruno Mars due to the similar voices the two have.

Discography

Studio albums

Extended plays

Singles

Music videos

References

External links
Basim page on Facebook
Basim blog on Tumblr
Basim page on LastFM

1992 births
Living people
Danish child singers
X Factor (Danish TV series) contestants
Danish people of Moroccan descent
Eurovision Song Contest entrants of 2014
Eurovision Song Contest entrants for Denmark
21st-century Danish  male singers